is a Japanese manga series written and illustrated by Kozue Amano, which began serialization in Mag Garden's Monthly Comic Blade magazine from November 2008. An anime television series adaptation by J.C.Staff aired in Japan between July and September 2016. The second season of the anime series aired between 7 April 2018 and 23 June 2018.

The manga ended on 10 May 2021 and shipped its final volume in November 2021.

The title Amanchu! appears to be a combination of ama (海人 (male) or 海女 (female), "diver"), and -nchu (人), an Okinawan suffix that means "person" or "people", for example as in Uchinānchu (沖縄人, "Okinawan").

Plot
Futaba Ooki, a shy girl who just moved in from the city to the oceanside town of Shizuoka, meets Hikari Kohinata, an erratic girl who loves scuba diving. Together, they join their school's Diving Club and discover the joys of underwater exploration.

Characters

An energetic girl who loves scuba diving. She's usually an absent-minded person, although she can be pretty insightful at times, especially when it comes to noticing how people feel. Being the kind of girl with a unique world view, she ends up dragging her friends along for her activities, usually making people discover new things. She usually says "Happyan~" when impressed or curious. She is nicknamed "Pikari" by her friends.

A girl who moved in from the city and joins the Diving Club on one of Hikari's impulses, even not knowing how to swim. She is an introverted person, and lacks self-confidence to the point of being let down by the smallest of failures. Usually being scared of new experiences, she's usually bound to follow Hikari's impulses to attain such. They eventually become best friends. She is nicknamed "Teko" by Hikari.

An upperclassman in the Diving Club. She's usually well-spirited and hot-blooded, although when put in romantic situations, she can show a softer side. She's usually the comic relief of the series, acting violently toward her younger brother, but deep inside she cares a lot for him.

Ai's younger brother, who is also in the Diving Club. Being more calm-minded than his older sister, he's usually the comic relief character, being the main aim of Ai's violence.

Hikari and Futaba's homeroom teacher and the advisor of the Diving Club. An experienced scuba diver and dedicated teacher. Although strict and serious, she firmly believes that practical work and self-discovery are important to every person's development.
 

A cat who hangs around the Diving Club's room. Sometimes it's seen wearing a diaper or a small cape.

A small kitten that hangs around with Aria in the Diving Club's room. She was saved from a bunch of crows by Hikari and Futaba when she was a stray. With Hikari unable to find someone to adopt her, the principal stepped in to care for her and give Aria somebody to socialize with.

Hikari's grandmother who runs a scuba diving gear rental shop by the beach.

Media

Manga
Kozue Amano began publishing the manga in Mag Garden's Monthly Comic Blade shōnen magazine on 29 November 2008. The series switched from a monthly to a quarterly publication schedule in late 2010 due to the author's pregnancy.

Volume list

Anime
A 12-episode anime television series adaptation aired between 8 July 2016 and 23 September 2016 and was simulcast by Crunchyroll. The series is directed by Junichi Sato and Kenichi Kasai, and written by Deko Akao. It is produced by animation studio J.C.Staff, with character designs by Yoko Ito. The music was composed by GONTITI and produced by Flying Dog. The opening theme song is "Million Clouds" by Maaya Sakamoto, while the ending song titled  is sung by Tekopikari, a duo consists of Eri Suzuki and Ai Kayano. An original video animation was included in the seventh Blu-ray/DVD volume released on 29 March 2017, later releasing on Crunchyroll on 12 October 2017. The series has been renewed with a second season titled Amachu! Advance. It aired between 7 April 2018 and 23 June 2018. Most of the staff returned, as Kiyoko Sayama replaced Kenichi Kasai as director. It also ran for 12 episodes. Crunchyroll streamed the second season.

Amanchu!

Amanchu! Advance

Notes

References

External links
  
  at Monthly Comic Blade 
 

2016 anime television series debuts
2018 anime television series debuts
IG Port franchises
J.C.Staff
Mag Garden manga
Shōnen manga
Slice of life anime and manga